The Bay Bridge Series,  or the Battle of the Bay, is a series of baseball games played between—and the rivalry of—Major League Baseball's Oakland Athletics of the American League and San Francisco Giants of the National League. The series takes its name from the San Francisco–Oakland Bay Bridge which links the cities of Oakland and San Francisco. As of 2018, the winner of the annual series retains a trophy fashioned from a piece of the original bridge.

Although competitive, the regional rivalry between the A's and Giants is considered a friendly one with mostly mutual companionship between the fans, as opposed to Cubs–White Sox, or Mets–Yankees games where animosity runs high, though sections of each fanbase does harbor towards the entirety of the other. This, however, is limited as many people see the opposing team as no threat to their own; hats displaying both teams on the cap are sold from vendors at the games, and once in a while the teams both dress in uniforms from a historic era of their franchises. Many fans actively cheer for both teams when they are not playing against the other. A's fans cite the Giants blocking a potential move to San Jose as a point of contention. 

The series is also occasionally referred to as the "BART Series" for the Bay Area Rapid Transit system that links Oakland to San Francisco. However, the name "BART Series" has never been popular beyond a small selection of history books and national broadcasters and has fallen out of favor, likely because BART does not provide direct or easy access to Oracle Park in San Francisco. Bay Area locals almost exclusively refer to the rivalry as the "Bay Bridge Series" or the "Battle of the Bay."

Originally, the term described a series of exhibition games played between the two clubs after the conclusion of spring training, immediately prior to the start of the regular season. It was first used to refer to the 1989 World Series which the Athletics won and the first time both teams had met since they moved to the San Francisco Bay Area. Today, it also refers to games played between the teams during the regular season since the commencement of Interleague play in 1997. Through the 2022 season, the A's have won 72 games, and the Giants have won 68.

History prior to Bay Area move
The Giants won, 4–1, in 1905, and the Athletics won in 1911 (4-1) and 1913 (4-2), respectively. Hall of Famers such as John McGraw, Roger Bresnahan, Christy Mathewson, Joe McGinnity and Rube Marquard took part on the Giants side while the Athletics had Connie Mack, Chief Bender, Eddie Plank, Rube Waddell, Frank Baker and Eddie Collins. Such World Series match-ups might have helped contribute to the modern New York-Philadelphia sports rivalry that still continues to this day.

The Move to the Bay

1989 World Series

The San Francisco Giants and Oakland Athletics met for the first time in the 1989 World Series. This series was interrupted minutes before Game 3 on October 17, 1989, when an earthquake, measuring 6.9 on the Richter Scale, struck the San Francisco Bay Area. The resulting damage to both Candlestick Park and to a lesser extent the Oakland Coliseum, along with the emotional and economic damage to the area, delayed the resumption of the series for 10 days, the longest interval between games in World Series history. The earthquake caused the collapse of a portion of the Bay Bridge, the centerpiece of many promotions for the "Bay Bridge Series"; however, experts have suggested that the Series actually helped to save countless lives, as many would-be commuters from both sides of the Bay had left work early or stayed in the cities to watch the game - as a result, traffic on the roads below collapsed portions of the Bay Bridge and Cypress Street Viaduct in Oakland (while this disaster killed 42 people, local officials initially assumed that the death toll would be well into the hundreds) was significantly lighter than it would normally be at rush hour.

The Athletics swept the Giants to win their most recent World Series championship.

Interleague play
Both teams met for the first time in the regular season in June 1997.

The Giants' Barry Zito started 0–4 against his former team, finally beating the Athletics on June 12, 2010 at AT&T Park.

Athletics relocation controversy
The A's have been considering relocating to San Jose, California, for 13 years but have reportedly met resistance from the Giants. San Jose is located in Santa Clara County, which is considered to be the Giants "territory". The Athletics claim that former owner Walter A. Haas, Jr. agreed for the Giants to take over the Santa Clara area when the Giants were considering moving to Florida and needed revenue. The Giants contend that the agreement was not based upon actually relocating the team to Santa Clara as the A's contended. MLB Commissioner Bud Selig, who was fraternity brothers with A's managing partner Lew Wolff at the University of Wisconsin, stated that the A's would not be able to survive as a franchise if they remained at the Oakland Coliseum. The Giants claimed that the territorial rights were "explicitly reaffirmed by Major League Baseball on four separate occasions," when former managing partner Peter Magowan bought the team in the early 1990s. The Giants stated "upon purchasing the team 20 years ago, our plan to revive the franchise relied heavily on targeting and solidifying our fan base in the largest and fastest growing county within our territory. Based on these Constitutionally-recognized territorial rights, the Giants invested hundreds of millions of dollars to save and stabilize the team for the Bay Area, built Oracle Park privately and has operated the franchise so that it can compete at the highest levels."

Future
With the A's threatening to leave Oakland due to issues with their stadium, the current Bay Bridge series and Bay Area series might end. After plans for Cisco Field were shuttered due to the Giants blocking the plan with the decision upheld by the United States Supreme Court, the A's have attempted to build their new waterfront stadium. With the city of Oakland not willing to help fund the stadium, the A's have been looking for areas outside of the Bay, including Las Vegas and Portland.

Results

See also

Dodgers–Giants rivalry, Los Angeles Dodgers vs. San Francisco Giants
Freeway Series, Los Angeles Dodgers vs. Los Angeles Angels of Anaheim
I–5 Series, San Diego Padres vs. Los Angeles Dodgers (both cities connected by interstate 5)
Subway Series, currently New York Yankees vs. New York Mets
Red Line Series, Chicago Cubs vs. Chicago White Sox (Named for the Red-line "L" route)
Beltway Series, Washington Nationals vs. Baltimore Orioles
Citrus Series, Miami Marlins vs. Tampa Bay Rays
Lone Star Series, Texas Rangers vs. Houston Astros
Ohio Cup, Cincinnati Reds vs. Cleveland Indians
Show–Me Series, St. Louis Cardinals vs. Kansas City Royals
49ers–Raiders rivalry

References

Oakland Athletics
San Francisco Giants
Interleague play
Major League Baseball rivalries
Sports in the San Francisco Bay Area
Annual events in Major League Baseball